The Women's 100m athletics events for the 2016 Summer Paralympics take place at the Estádio Olímpico João Havelange from September 8 to September 17, 2016. A total of 15 events were contested over this distance for 19 different classifications.

Schedule

Medal summary

Results

The following were the results of the finals of each of the women's 100 metres events in each of the classifications. Further details of each event are available on that event's dedicated page.

T11

T12

T13

T34

The Women's T34 race was also open to T33 athletes. There were no heats, and all eight athletes competed in the final.

T35

As only seven athletes entered the T35 event, no heats were held and all athletes automatically qualified for the final.

Wind: −0.6 m/s

T36

10:43 9 September 2016:

T37

17:36 9 September 2016:

T38

The T38 event was for athletes with cerebral palsy the least amount of impediment.

T42

19:52 17 September 2016:

T44

20:34 17 September 2016:

T47

Wind: +0.2 m/s

T52

11:05 17 September 2016:

T53

18:54 8 September 2016:

T54

19:14 9 September 2016:

References

Athletics at the 2016 Summer Paralympics
2016